Gavkan is a city in East Azerbaijan Province, Iran.

Gavkan may also refer to:
Gavkan-e Bagh, Kerman Province
Gavkan-e Guran, Kerman Province
Gavkan Rural District, in Kerman Province